Insalebria kozhantshikovi is a species of snout moth in the genus Insalebria. It was described by Ivan Nikolayevich Filipjev in 1924 and is known from Russia.

References

Moths described in 1924
Phycitinae